Hadi Sharify  (born 19 December 1977) is a Saudi Arabian football defender who plays for Al Hazm Club in Saudi Arabia.

Club career
Sharifi was in Al-Nasr's squad for the 2000 FIFA Club World Championship.

International career
Sharify made one appearance with the senior Saudi Arabia national football team during the 2006 FIFA World Cup qualifying rounds.

References

 

1977 births
Living people
Saudi Arabian footballers
Saudi Arabia international footballers
Al Nassr FC players
Al-Hazem F.C. players
Sdoos Club players
Al-Arabi SC (Saudi Arabia) players
Saudi First Division League players
Saudi Second Division players
Saudi Professional League players
Association football defenders